Rodrigo Báez is a Paraguayan footballer forward.

Club career
On 16 January 2012, Báez reached a five-year deal with Chilean powerhouse Colo-Colo, which bought the 50% rights for a US$300.000 fee. However, two weeks later he returned to his country, joining on loan to Deportivo Capiatá — after being on trial with coach Ivo Basay — to finish his studies.

After completing his loan spell and studies, he returned to Colo-Colo on 20 December.

In June 2014, he joined Primera B (second-tier) side Deportes La Serena on loan, where played all matches of the 2014–15 season with the IV Region of Coquimbo-based team.

On 18 May 2015, it was reported that he returned to Colo-Colo and joined the pre-season and began to train with the first adult team under coach José Luis Sierra on the head, to face the season.

International career
He has represented Paraguay in under-15 and under-17 levels, having won the South American Under-15 Football Championship in 2009, being the team captain.

However, Báez failed to play the 2013 South American Youth Championship because "if he doesn’t sign for Olimpia (Paraguayan club), he wouldn‘t go the national team", so the coach Víctor Genes not considered him.

References

External links
 
 Fussball Talente Profile

Association football midfielders
Living people
Chilean Primera División players
Colo-Colo footballers
Deportes La Serena footballers
Expatriate footballers in Chile
Paraguayan expatriate footballers
Paraguayan footballers
Paraguay international footballers
Primera B de Chile players
Year of birth missing (living people)